Ion Canet Betancourt (born in Havana), is a female beach volleyball player from Cuba, who participated in the NORCECA Beach Volleyball Circuit in the 2007, playing with Kirenia Ballar; and 2008, playing with Nirian Sinal.

In the Cuban Beach Volleyball National Championship she earned the 2009 championship playing with Milagros Crespo.

References

External links
 
 

Living people
Cuban beach volleyball players
Women's beach volleyball players
Year of birth missing (living people)